ASEAN Heritage Parks (AHP) are selected protected areas in the ASEAN region that are known for their unique biodiversity and ecosystems, wilderness and outstanding values in scenic, cultural, educational, research, recreational and tourism. Its vision is "An ASEAN region whose biological is conserved, sustainably managed and used, and equitably shared for the well-being of its peoples." The ASEAN Centre for Biodiversity (ACB) in the Philippines serves as the secretariat of the ASEAN Heritage Parks Programme.

The ASEAN Heritage Parks were established as the ASEAN national heritage parks and nature reserves on 29 November 1984 when only 6 countries: Brunei, Indonesia, Malaysia, Philippines, Singapore and Thailand were member countries. They became known by the present name on 18 December 2003 after Cambodia, Laos, Myanmar and Vietnam joined the organisation between 1995 and 1999. Through declarations, ASEAN member countries agreed that, "common cooperation is necessary to conserve and manage the parks for the development and implementation of regional conservation as well as regional mechanisms complementary to national efforts to implement conservation measures.

Fifty ASEAN Heritage Parks have been designated as of 2019. Nine sites are designated as UNESCO World Heritage Sites: Kinabalu National Park of Malaysia; Gunung Mulu National Park of Malaysia; Lorentz National Park of Indonesia; Kerinci Seblat National Park and Gunung Leuser National Park as 2 of 3 national parks that form Tropical Rainforest Heritage of Sumatra of Indonesia; Tubbataha Reefs Natural Park of the Philippines; Mount Hamiguitan Range Wildlife Sanctuary of the Philippines; Khao Yai National Park and Kaeng Krachan National Park of Thailand.

List of parks
The following is a list of areas designated as ASEAN Heritage Parks.

References

External links

 ASEAN Heritage Parks

 
Biodiversity
Nature conservation in Asia
Nature reserves